La Tâche is a commune in the Charente department in southwestern France.

Population

See also
 Communes of the Charente department

References

External links 
 

Communes of Charente